Fireworks Still Alive is the fifth live album by the German heavy metal band Bonfire.  It was released in 2011 by LZ Records and Sony Music.  All the live performances on the album were recorded at various venues/concerts by Bonfire throughout Europe.  The concept was to celebrate the 25th anniversary of the release of the band's studio album, Fireworks, and the entire album is presented on the live edition.  In addition, the band included live performances of a song from their last studio album as well as a cover song from Gotthard.  One studio song was included, an edited version of Let It Grow from Branded.

Track listing

Personnel 
Claus Lessmann – lead vocals, guitar
Hans Ziller – lead and acoustic guitars
Chris Limburg – rhythm guitar
Uwe Köhler – bass
Dominik Huelshorst – drums, percussion

Bonfire (band) live albums
2011 live albums